The 1995 Queensland state election was held on 15 July 1995.

By-elections
 On 30 April 1994, Ted Malone (National) was elected to succeed Jim Randell (National), who had resigned on 31 March 1994, as the member for Mirani.

Retiring Members

Labor
Ed Casey (Mackay)
Pat Comben (Kedron)
Ken Vaughan (Nudgee)
Anne Warner (South Brisbane)

Candidates
Sitting members are shown in bold text.

See also
Members of the Queensland Legislative Assembly, 1992–1995
Members of the Queensland Legislative Assembly, 1995–1998
1995 Queensland state election
List of political parties in Australia

References
Psephos: Adam Carr's Election Archive - Queensland 1995
 Queensland Legislative Assembly (1995). Details of polling at general election held on 15 July 1995.
 Green, Antony. 1995 Election Totals and Electorate Results

Candidates for Queensland state elections